Denis Sergeyevich Uryvkov (born 28 March 1985) is a Russian former professional football player.

Club career
He made his Russian Football National League debut for FC Metallurg-Kuzbass Novokuznetsk on 9 July 2004 in a game against FC Terek Grozny.

External links
 

1985 births
Living people
Russian footballers
Association football midfielders
FC Novokuznetsk players